Lirabuccinum is a genus of sea snails, marine gastropod mollusks in the family Buccinidae, the true whelks.

Species
Species within the genus Lirabuccinum listed by the World Register of Marine Species include:
 Lirabuccinum dirum (Reeve, 1846)
 Lirabuccinum fuscolabiatum (E. A. Smith, 1875)
 Lirabuccinum hokkaidonis (Pilsbry, 1901)
 Lirabuccinum musculus Callomon & Lawless, 2013
Species brought into synonymy
 Lirabuccinum constrictum (Dall, 1918): synonym of Lirabuccinum fuscolabiatum (E. A. Smith, 1875)

References

 Callomon P. & Lawless A. (2013) On the Recent members of the genus Lirabuccinum Vermeij, 1991 in the northern Pacific, with description of a new species (Gastropoda: Buccinidae). Venus 71(1-2): 13–27.

Buccinidae